Sir William Thornley Stoker, 1st Baronet (6 March 1845 – July 1912), was an Irish medical writer, anatomist and surgeon. He served as chair of anatomy and president of the Royal College of Surgeons in Ireland, president of the Royal Academy of Medicine in Ireland, and professor of anatomy at the Royal Hibernian Academy.

Life
His parents were Abraham Stoker (1799–1876), from Dublin, and the feminist Charlotte Mathilda Blake Thornley (1818–1901), baptized in St. Anne's Church, Ballyshannon Co. Donegal on 28 June 1818, who was raised in Sligo Town. Charlotte's father, Thomas Thornley, came from Ballyshannon, a town in the south of County Donegal in Ulster. Stoker was the eldest of seven children and the brother of the writer Bram Stoker. He was educated at a private school in England and at the Royal College of Surgeons, Dublin, and Queen's College, Galway, where he obtained his M. D. degree in 1866. During the later part of his life he lived at Ely House in Ely Place, Dublin, where he entertained many visitors, artists and writers.

Medical career

He began his career by teaching medicine. After a few years he was appointed surgeon to the Royal City of Dublin Hospital. In 1873 he moved on to the Richmond Hospital.

For several years from 1876 he held the chair of Anatomy at the Royal College of Surgeons in Ireland, until his other interests became too pressing. From 1876 he was surgeon to Swift's Hospital (founded by Jonathan Swift), and a Governor of both it and the Richmond Hospital. Together with his brother-in-law and hospital colleague Richard Thomson he founded the school of nursing at the Richmond and oversaw the construction of the surgical facilities there in 1899. He succeeded Richard Thomson as Inspector of Vivisection for Ireland.

All the time he was active in hospitals he was a frequent contributor to the Dublin Journal of Medical Science and similar journals on a variety of medical topics, but took a special interest in surgery of the spino-cerebral cavity. He campaigned against the Workhouse system and cruelty to animals.

In 1896 he became president of the Royal College of Surgeons in Ireland and was from 1903 to 1906 president of the Royal Academy of Medicine. He was very interested in art. He was professor of anatomy at the Royal Hibernian Academy and a governor of the National Gallery of Ireland. He resigned from many of his medical duties in 1910, due to fatigue. The following year he was created a baronet, of Hatch Street in the City of Dublin. He died in June 1912, aged 67, when the baronetcy became extinct.

References and sources

1845 births
1912 deaths
Irish surgeons
Bram Stoker
People from County Dublin
Baronets in the Baronetage of the United Kingdom